Fray Marcos is a town in the Florida Department of southern-central Uruguay.

Geography

History
It was founded in December 1888, and on 23 May 1919, it was declared a "Pueblo" (village) by the Act of Ley Nº 6.906. Its status was elevated to "Villa" (town) on 5 July 1956 by the Act of Ley Nº 12.297.

Population
In 2011 Fray Marcos had a population of 2,398.
 
Source: Instituto Nacional de Estadística de Uruguay

Places of worship
 Most Pure Heart of Mary Parish Church (Roman Catholic)

References

External links

INE map of Fray Marcos

Populated places in the Florida Department